John Charles Parker (4 January 1864 – 5 November 1927) was a British trade unionist.

Born in Clayton-le-Moors, Parker became a weaver and was elected as secretary of the Clayton Weavers' Association.  This was part of the Amalgamated Weavers' Association (AWA), and Parker was elected as assistant secretary of the AWA.  In 1925, the general secretary, Joseph Cross, died suddenly, and in March, Parker won an election to succeed him.  However, he also died unexpectedly, a little over two years later.

References

1864 births
1927 deaths
General Secretaries of the Amalgamated Weavers' Association
People from Clayton-le-Moors